The 1949 Cork Junior Hurling Championship was the 52nd staging of the Cork Junior Hurling Championship since its establishment by the Cork County Board.

On 23 October 1949, Bandon won the championship following a 7-03 to 1-02 defeat of Kanturk in the final at the Cork Athletic Grounds. This was their second championship title overall and a first title in 20 years.

Results

Final

References

Cork Junior Hurling Championship
Cork Junior Hurling Championship